KDFX-CD (channel 33) is a low-powered, Class A television station licensed to both Indio and Palm Springs, California, United States, serving as the Fox affiliate for the Coachella Valley. It is owned by the News-Press & Gazette Company alongside Palm Springs–licensed ABC affiliate KESQ-TV (channel 42) and four other low-power stations: Cathedral City–licensed Class A CBS affiliate KPSP-CD (channel 38), Palm Springs–licensed CW affiliate KCWQ-LD (channel 2), Indio-licensed Telemundo affiliate KUNA-LD (channel 15), and AccuWeather affiliate KYAV-LD (channel 12). The six stations share studios on Dunham Way in Thousand Palms; KDFX-CD's transmitter is located on Edom Hill northeast of Cathedral City and I-10.

Along with other major Coachella Valley television stations, KDFX identifies itself on-air using its cable designation (Fox 11) rather than its over-the-air channel position. The unusual practice stems in part from the area's exceptionally high cable penetration rate of 80.5% which is one of the highest in the United States.

In addition to its own digital signal, KDFX is simulcast in standard definition on KESQ's fourth digital subchannel (virtual channel 33.2) from the same Edom Hill transmitter facility.

History
The station signed on March 2, 1990, as K40DB, a translator of CBS affiliate KECY-TV in El Centro. The station was added on cable television on November 1, 1992. Along with its parent outlet, the station switched to Fox in September 1994, becoming the first CBS affiliate in the United States to join the so-called "fourth network" outside of the network's 1994 affiliation agreement with New World Communications. In fact, one reason owner Judge Robinson O. Everett of Wilmington, North Carolina signed with Fox was because Fox was willing to give Everett the primary Palm Springs affiliation, whereas CBS felt that KCBS-TV had sufficient penetration in the area and was demanding that the company's CBS affiliates resume producing local news. Prior to this switch, KECY aired some Fox programming, and cable viewers received KTTV from Los Angeles. Coinciding with the change, the translator began identifying as "KDBA-TV".

In 1997, Pacific Media Corporation (which was principally controlled by Robinson O. Everett) entered into a local management agreement (LMA) with a subsidiary of Beverly Hills, California-based Lambert Broadcasting, LLC. That company split the translator off and relaunched it as a separate Fox affiliate serving the Coachella Valley. On August 23 of that year, the station moved to UHF channel 33 and adopted KDFX-LP as its call sign. The LMA and options to purchase the two stations were sold a year later to the News-Press Gazette Company of St. Joseph, Missouri, bringing KDFX under common control with KESQ-TV. Lambert invested heavily in the station and upgraded it to Class A status on April 7, 2003, as KDFX-CA. In November 2007, NPG filed to buy the stations for $2 million. The station was licensed for digital operation on March 18, 2015, taking on the call sign KDFX-CD.

Programming

Syndicated programming
Syndicated programming on KDFX includes The Wendy Williams Show, The Real, The Simpsons and Mike & Molly among others.

Newscasts

KDFX airs a two-hour morning newscast (7–9 a.m.) and 6:30 and 10 p.m. newscasts from KESQ-TV.

Subchannels
The station's digital signal is multiplexed:

See also
Channel 11 branded TV stations in the United States
Channel 33 low-power TV stations in the United States
Channel 33 digital TV stations in the United States

References

External links
KESQ-TV "NewsChannel 3 HD"
KCWQ-LP/LD "Palm Springs CW 5"
KUNA-LD "Telemundo 15"

Television channels and stations established in 1990
DFX-CD
Indio, California
News-Press & Gazette Company
Low-power television stations in the United States
1990 establishments in California
Fox network affiliates